The 1979 Bulgarian Cup Final was the 39th final of the Bulgarian Cup (in this period the tournament was named Cup of the Soviet Army), and was contested between Levski Sofia and Beroe Stara Zagora on 23 May 1979 at Vasil Levski National Stadium in Sofia. Levski won the final 4–1.

Match

Details

See also
1978–79 A Group

References

Bulgarian Cup finals
PFC Levski Sofia matches
Cup Final